Xie Linka (born 1981) is a Chinese physician who gave early warning about the spread of COVID-19 in Wuhan, China. She became known for being a whistleblower, a title given to others in China who had warned the public, such as Liu Wen, and Dr. Li Wenliang, who was infected and later died from the virus.

Education
Xie Linka graduated with a PhD from the Tongji Medical College of Huazhong University of Science and Technology, and is the attending physician at the Cancer Center at Wuhan Union Hospital.

Whistleblowing incident 
On December 30, 2019, Xie Linka posted a message in the WeChat group for her workplace, the Cancer Center at Wuhan Union Hospital.

She stated, "Don't visit Huanan Seafood Wholesale Market in the near future. Many people there have contracted an inexplicable pneumonia (similar to SARS). Our hospital has admitted numerous pneumonia patients from the Huanan Seafood Wholesale Market today. Everyone, please make sure to wear masks and keep your room ventilated," and cited her source as "news posted in our alumni group by a junior from my hospital."

Police call
Around January 3, 2020, Xie received a phone call from the Wuhan Police, instructing her not to spread "false information", although she noted they were "very polite" in their tone.

Interview comment
Xie later stated in an interview that her "early warning" to the public was part of a doctor's duty.

See also 
 COVID-19 pandemic
 COVID-19 pandemic in mainland China
 Li Wenliang
 Liu Wen
 Jiang Yanyong

References 

Chinese whistleblowers
Huazhong University of Science and Technology alumni
21st-century Chinese physicians
Chinese women physicians
21st-century women physicians
1981 births
Living people
COVID-19 researchers